In mathematics, a solvmanifold is a homogeneous space of a connected solvable Lie group. It may also be characterized as a quotient of a connected solvable Lie group by a closed subgroup. (Some authors also require that the Lie group be simply-connected, or that the quotient be compact.)
A special class of solvmanifolds, nilmanifolds, was introduced by Anatoly Maltsev, who proved the first structural theorems. Properties of general solvmanifolds are similar, but somewhat more complicated.

Examples 

 A solvable Lie group is trivially a solvmanifold.
 Every nilpotent group is solvable, therefore, every nilmanifold is a solvmanifold. This class of examples includes n-dimensional tori and the quotient of the 3-dimensional real Heisenberg group by its integral Heisenberg subgroup.
 The Möbius band and the Klein bottle are solvmanifolds that are not nilmanifolds.
 The mapping torus of an Anosov diffeomorphism of the n-torus is a solvmanifold. For , these manifolds belong to Sol, one of the eight Thurston geometries.

Properties 

 A solvmanifold is diffeomorphic to the total space of a vector bundle over some compact solvmanifold. This statement was conjectured by George Mostow and proved by Louis Auslander and Richard Tolimieri.
 The fundamental group of an arbitrary solvmanifold is polycyclic.
 A compact solvmanifold is determined up to diffeomorphism by its fundamental group.
 Fundamental groups of compact solvmanifolds may be characterized as group extensions of free abelian groups of finite rank by finitely generated torsion-free nilpotent groups.
 Every solvmanifold is aspherical. Among all compact homogeneous spaces, solvmanifolds may be characterized by the properties of being aspherical and having a solvable fundamental group.

Completeness 

Let  be a real Lie algebra. It is called a complete Lie algebra if each map

in its adjoint representation is hyperbolic, i.e., it has only real eigenvalues. Let G be a solvable Lie group whose Lie algebra  is complete. Then for any closed subgroup  of G, the solvmanifold  is a complete solvmanifold.

References 

 

Lie algebras
Structures on manifolds